The 1971 Nashville 420 was a NASCAR Winston Cup Series event that took place on July 24, 1971, at Nashville Speedway in Nashville, Tennessee.

Background
Nashville Speedway was converted to a half-mile paved oval in 1957, when it began to be a NASCAR series track. The speedway was lengthened between the 1969 and 1970 seasons. The corners were cut down from 35 degrees to their present 18 degrees in 1972.

Race report
It took two hours and forty-seven minutes to complete 420 laps of racing at a paved oval track spanning . He defeated James Hylton by more than four laps in his 1971 Plymouth Roadrunner machine.

Dale Inman would be credited as the winning crew chief for this race. Other crew chiefs that were important to the race were Vic Ballard and Lee Gordon. Ten thousand people would watch two lead changes and four cautions for 46 laps.

Earl Brooks would make his best career finish with a fourth-place performance; he experienced tire problems as the race progressed and was unable to lead a lap. Brooks' team only had top 10s in 12% of its races, but 11% of their total top 10s came in this race.

All 29 of these competitors were American-born males. Other notable names include future car owner Richard Childress, Sterling Marlin's father Coo Coo, Elmo Langley, and Bobby Allison (one of the famous Allison brothers of NASCAR history). The total purse for this racing event was $20,980 ($ when adjusted for inflation).

Richard Petty received $4,325 ($ when adjusted for inflation) for his well-deserved victory while last-place finisher Dick May only received $215 ($ when adjusted for inflation).

Qualifying

Finishing order

 Richard Petty (No. 43)
 James Hylton† (No. 48)
 Benny Parsons† (No. 72)
 Earl Brooks† (No. 26)
 J.D. McDuffie† (No. 70)
 Walter Ballard (No. 30)
 Jabe Thomas† (No. 23)
 Henley Gray (No. 19)
 Ben Arnold (No. 76)
 Bill Hollar† (No. 28)
 Ed Negre*† (No. 8)
 Ken Meisenhelder (No. 41)
 Dean Dalton* (No. 7)
 Jerry Churchill† (No. 73)
 Frank Warren (No. 79)
 Cecil Gordon† (No. 24)
 Elmo Langley*† (No. 64)
 Bill Champion*† (No. 10)
 David Sisco*† (No. 05)
 Wendell Scott*† (No. 34)
 Richard Childress* (No. 96)
 Bill Shirey* (No. 74)
 Robert Brown* (No. 58)
 D.K. Ulrich* (No. 40)
 Coo Coo Marlin*† (No. 07)
 Wayne Smith* (No. 38)
 Bobby Allison* (No. 12)
 Bill Seifert* (No. 25)
 Dick May* (No. 67)

† signifies that the driver is known to be deceased 
* Driver failed to finish race

References

Nashville 420
Nashville 420
NASCAR races at Fairgrounds Speedway